Eulimella cerullii is a species of sea snail, a marine gastropod mollusk in the family Pyramidellidae, the pyrams and their allies.

Description
The size of the shell varies between 3.5 mm and 7 mm. The thin, semitransparent, white shell is very glossy. The teleoconch contains ten whorls that are  flattened and with a slight suture. The columella has a small, tooth-like thickening.

Distribution
This species occurs in the following locations:
 European waters (ERMS scope)
 Greek Exclusive Economic Zone
 Portuguese Exclusive Economic Zone : Madeira (at a depth of 1100 m) 
 Spanish Exclusive Economic Zone

References

External links
 
 To CLEMAM
 To Encyclopedia of Life
 To World Register of Marine Species

cerullii
Molluscs of the Atlantic Ocean
Molluscs of the Mediterranean Sea
Gastropods described in 1916